The 1984–85 2. Bundesliga season was the eleventh season of the 2. Bundesliga, the second tier of the German football league system.

1. FC Nürnberg, Hannover 96 and 1. FC Saarbrücken were promoted to the Bundesliga while FC St. Pauli, VfR 1910 Bürstadt, Kickers Offenbach and SSV Ulm 1846 were relegated to the Oberliga.

League table
For the 1984–85 season VfR 1910 Bürstadt, FC 08 Homburg, FC St. Pauli and Blau-Weiß 90 Berlin were newly promoted to the 2. Bundesliga from the Oberliga while 1. FC Nürnberg and Kickers Offenbach had been relegated to the league from the Bundesliga.

Results

Top scorers 
The league's top scorers:

References

External links
 2. Bundesliga 1984/1985 at Weltfussball.de 
 1984–85 2. Bundesliga at kicker.de 

1984-85
2
Ger